Heikki Niskanen (28 August 1896 – 16 June 1962) was a Finnish farmer and politician, born in Nivala. He was a Member of the Parliament of Finland, representing the People's Party from 1933 to 1936, the Small Farmers Party from 1936 to 1941 and the Agrarian League from 1941 to 1945.

References

1896 births
1962 deaths
People from Nivala
People from Oulu Province (Grand Duchy of Finland)
Finnish Lutherans
People's Party (Finland, 1932) politicians
Small Farmers' Party politicians
Centre Party (Finland) politicians
Members of the Parliament of Finland (1933–36)
Members of the Parliament of Finland (1936–39)
Members of the Parliament of Finland (1939–45)
People of the Finnish Civil War (White side)
Finnish military personnel of World War II
20th-century Lutherans